Youssouf Ahamadi (born 27 July 1982) is a former footballer who played as a right winger. Born in Mayotte, he played for the Comoros national team.

Club career
Born in Manjagou, Mayotte, Ahamadi played club football for Jura Sud, Besançon RC, and Belfort. He retired at the end of the 2018–19 season.

International career 
Ahamadi made his international debut for Comoros in 2014.

Career statistics

References

1982 births
Living people
Mayotte footballers
French footballers
Comorian footballers
French sportspeople of Comorian descent
Citizens of Comoros through descent
Comoros international footballers
Association football wingers
Jura Sud Foot players
Racing Besançon players
ASM Belfort players
Championnat National 2 players
Championnat National players